Al Khatim Desert is a desert on the way to Al Ain from Abu Dhabi, Al Khatim desert is amazing location to do off-road riding experiences, United Arab Emirates.

The local tour haris operators those who conduct 4x4 tours from Abu Dhabi created many fabulous track that meanders between untouched ranges of sand dunes, following the valleys that naturally occur where alluvial plains gently percolate underground run-off water from the Omani mountains in the direction of Abu Dhabi city. The beauty of this area is its quiet, rolling landscape, virgin dunes and the openness of the desert. 

Al Khatim Desert Road  rock is a nice old desert high way with one lien each side it is in Al Khatim deserts in Abu Dhabi, It lies near the Road E22 in the middle between Abu Dhabi and Al Ain.

Al Khatim Desert – 80 kilometers from Abu Dhabi City, where the sand dunes are challenging for first-timers, a good start to experience the desert driving.

References

Deserts of the United Arab Emirates